Space Station 13, often shortened to SS13, is a top-down tile based action role-playing multiplayer video game running on the freeware BYOND game engine, originally released in 2003.

The game is set on a futuristic space station; however, location can differ depending on the game server, including spacecraft and exoplanets. The core game is defined by its emphasis on player roles: at the start of every round, players choose or are given various roles and attempt to either help or hinder others' progress.

Space Station 13 is a popular multiplayer game that takes place in a sci-fi setting, usually on a space station or spacecraft, but can also take place on exoplanets or other locations depending on the game server. The game is known for its complexity and depth, with a wide variety of gameplay mechanics, character roles, and emergent gameplay possibilities.

One of the defining features of Space Station 13 is its emphasis on player roles. At the beginning of each round, players choose or are assigned a specific role on the station, such as a medical doctor, engineer, security officer, chef, or scientist. Each role has unique responsibilities, equipment, and abilities that are crucial to the smooth functioning of the station.

Players are free to work together with their fellow crewmates to complete tasks and keep the station running smoothly, or they can choose to cause chaos and disrupt the work of others. The game has a variety of different game modes and win conditions, which can range from simple survival to complex conspiracies and political intrigue.

Gameplay
Space Station 13's gameplay is based on the content, settings, and code applied on the game server. Due to the largely open source nature of the game, sessions are typically hosted on user maintained and customized game servers which can alter or vary the gameplay experience. Sessions are played in rounds, where players can create a customized character, begin playing with a randomly generated one, or use a previously existing character. Players can choose different jobs, such as janitor, engineer, or clown which dictate their role and responsibilities. Sessions are usually isolated from each other so players can choose to change their job, character, or playstyle in between rounds.

The player can interact with nearly any object or being in the game world in a context-sensitive fashion. Different results will occur depending on many variables in any given interaction (e.g. using a crowbar on another player would attack them but using it on a floorboard would pry it up). Additionally, depending on the server, the player can change their character's 'intent' between four different states (Help, Disarm, Grab, Harm) which will further influence actions taken. For example, using the player's hands on a fallen character with help intent would help them up from the ground, while using harm intent could punch or kick them. Additionally, some servers use a "combat mode" system that assigns these intents to the left and right mouse buttons, with a single key to alternate between two modes that have different effects. Some servers also entirely lack the intent/combat mode system. Controls can differ greatly between servers, but WASD/arrow key based movement and a "hand" system are fairly consistent. 

The game fully simulates power, biology, atmosphere, chemistry, and other complex object and environmental interactions depending on game settings.

While different servers may have their unique station constructs, generally there are eight departments aboard the station. Supply and Service are also often grouped in the Civilian category.

 Command (taking leadership roles aboard the station).
 Security (enforcing the law, keeping peace and responding to emergencies aboard the station).
 Engineering (generating power and keeping utilities maintained aboard the station, such as keeping doors functional, supplying internal atmospherics, and repairing damage).
 Science (researching technologies and genetic mutations, breeding slimes, and developing 'Synthetics' aboard the station).
 Medical (keeping the crew healthy, performing most surgeries, researching diseases and cloning deceased players aboard the station).
 Supply (mining for minerals on a nearby planet, and taking charge of requisitions, such as purchasing goods for departments & crew-members as well as sorting through disposed items).
 Service (keeping the station clean and providing food, drinks, and entertainment for the crew.).
 Synthetics/Silicons (consisting of the station's A.I and cyborgs, who are often bound by the Three Laws of Robotics, which restrict AI from committing illegal acts, such as assaulting a crew member, unless someone changes said laws).

Optimally, all players spawn at the beginning of each round and perform their jobs, not accounting for human error and malicious intent. However, randomly selected players are chosen to spawn as 'antagonists' aboard the station. Antagonists can range from mostly normal characters with certain malicious intentions, rogue artificial intelligences, and a wide assortment of monsters and enemies, such as changelings, aliens, Lovecraftian horrors, assassins, and death squads armed with nuclear weapons. It can be difficult for normal crew members to identify antagonists, and even harder to determine their objectives.

Due to the presence of antagonists (and, sometimes, due to players failing at their assigned jobs), many rounds escalate into chaos and disorder. While communities can have pre-set match timings, often rounds are concluded when the situation becomes critical and evacuation procedures are initiated.

There are several different servers to play on, each sporting their own set of rules and gameplay elements. Examples include Goonstation, originally created by users of Something Awful (who are collectively referred to as "goons"), CM-SS13 (with CM standing for Colonial Marines), a server inspired by the Alien franchise, /tg/station 13, originally created by members of 4chan's /tg/ or "traditional games" board and Paradise Station, a popular generalist server with a large Russian offshoot.

Plot
Due to each server's lack of an agreed canonical storyline, most if not all servers have individualized lores and backstories. Generally, Space Station 13 takes place several centuries in the future on a research station owned by the megacorporation known as Nanotrasen. The station exists to research the mineral 'plasma' (or 'phoron' on some servers), which is very valuable, possibly due to its extreme flammability. Nanotrasen's influence and power have effectively made them a government entity, but is often left ambiguous as to whether they are good, evil or a neutral party (depending on the server).

Due to Nanotrasen's immense stature and massive monopoly on plasma, it is targeted by an array of third-party aggressors. This includes, but is not limited to: the Syndicate (a coalition of smaller companies and planetary governments), the Space Wizard Federation (a federal group of thaumaturgical aggressors), and Changelings (an extraterrestrial species with the ability to take on the form of any organic life-form they've absorbed, as seen in The Thing).

Servers 
There are several different types of servers in Space Station 13, each with its own focus and gameplay style. Some of the most popular server types include:

 Standard Station: These servers are the most common and traditional type of Space Station 13 server. They are set on a futuristic space station and feature a variety of different roles and jobs for players to choose from. The focus of the gameplay is on survival, completing tasks, and working with other players to keep the station running smoothly.
 Extended: Extended servers typically have longer rounds and more complex objectives than standard stations. Players have more time to complete their tasks and there may be more advanced technologies or features available. Extended servers are a good choice for players who enjoy longer, more challenging gameplay experiences.
 Secret: Secret servers are focused on conspiracies and intrigue, and often feature hidden objectives and complex storylines. Players are encouraged to work together to uncover secrets and uncover the truth behind various events and situations on the station.
 Hardcore: Hardcore servers are designed to be very challenging and punishing for players. They often have more aggressive antagonists and more difficult survival conditions, making the gameplay very tense and intense.
 Colonial Marines: Colonial Marines is a popular variant of Space Station 13 that is set in the world of the Alien movie franchise. In this game mode, players take on the role of space marines who must work together to survive against waves of Xenomorphs, as well as other threats like malfunctioning equipment and traitorous crew members. Colonial Marines is a unique and thrilling game mode that offers a different type of gameplay experience from traditional Space Station 13.

Development
Space Station 13 was originally developed as an atmospherics simulator by Exadv1 in 2003. Its closed source codebase was decompiled in 2007, giving rise to SS13's current popularity.

A large number of promising community efforts to remake SS13 have been started over the years due to longstanding frustration with SS13's closed-source engine BYOND, and low quality of code. Most of these attempts have since been abandoned, and a community mythos has jokingly built up around "The Curse", a supposed force that is responsible for the failure of all attempts to remake the game.

Regardless, multiple major SS13 remakes are currently in development: Space Station 14, Unitystation,and RE:SS3D.

Reception 
Space Station 13 garnered attention from various video game journalism websites over the years.

The game served as a direct inspiration for the role-playing video game Barotrauma, and was also mentioned by Eurogamer as an inspiration for the now-cancelled game ION by DayZ creator Dean "Rocket" Hall. He then later released Stationeers, which was also inspired by Space Station 13.

Rock, Paper, Shotgun named Space Station 13 on its list of "Best free PC games" in 2016 and 2019.

See also
 List of open source games

References

External links
 

2003 video games
Role-playing video games
Space MOGs
Windows games
Open-source video games
Social deduction video games
Simulation video games
Multiplayer online games
Top-down video games
Video games set in outer space